Ode to the Flame is the second studio album by a German sludge metal band Mantar which was released by Nuclear Blast on 15 April 2016.

Release
Mantar made his first announcement of Ode to the Flame on 27 January 2016. On 24 March 2016, Mantar began streaming audio snippets for the tracks featured on their announced album, Ode to the Flame. A limited vinyl LP was released by Tower Records the same year.

Reception

In a review for Distorted Sound, James Halstead said that "the real strength of Ode to the Flame is its diversity in sonic assault". Joseph Collins of the CVLT Nation said that "with the release of their venomous sophomore release entitled Ode to the Flame on Nuclear Blast, Mantar are poised to salt the earth and burn everything within their sight". In his closing comments, Yidu Sun of Metal Wani, said that "'Ode to the Flame' is a crushing, appropriately melodic, and dynamic sludge metal album that is intelligent and mature but lacks in personality". Shawn Miller of The Metal Observer said that "'Ode to the Flame' is a step in the right direction for Mantar" and added that "[the album] offers much to enjoy and will definitely be a contender for many year end best of lists".

Track listing

Personnel
Hanno Klänhardt – lead vocals/lead guitar
Erinç Sakarya – drums

Charts

References

2016 albums
Nuclear Blast albums
Tower Records albums